The Central Core Historic District is a historic district in Citronelle, Alabama, United States. It is roughly bounded by State Street and LeBaron Avenue from Mobile to Second streets. It was placed on the National Register of Historic Places on January 25, 1990.

References

Historic districts in Mobile County, Alabama
National Register of Historic Places in Mobile County, Alabama
Historic districts on the National Register of Historic Places in Alabama